The Bretagne Classic, also called Bretagne Classic Ouest-France, is an elite cycling classic held annually in late summer around the Breton village of Plouay in western France.

The race was originally named Grand–Prix de Plouay and, from 1989 to 2015, GP Ouest-France. It was included in the inaugural UCI ProTour in 2005 and in 2011 in its successor, the UCI World Tour. Since 2016 it is called Bretagne Classic Ouest-France.

Since 2002, a women's event, the GP de Plouay – Bretagne is organized on Saturday, the day before the men's race. Supporting events have grown over the years and now include BMX races, track racing and a mass-participation ride, as part of a four–day festival in the last summer weekend in Brittany.

History

The Bretagne Classic, originally named Circuit de Plouay and later the Grand-Prix de Plouay, was created in 1931 by former Tour de France doctor Berty, who used his influence to attract some of the biggest names of French cycling to the inaugural edition. Breton rider François Favé won the inaugural edition. In its first decades the race was dominated by French riders. The first non-French winner was Italian Ugo Anzile in 1954, the second was Holland's Frits Pirard in 1979. Ten riders have won the race two times, all of them French except Oliver Naesen, the most recent to do so with wins in 2016 and 2018.

Throughout its history, the roll of honour includes some illustrious winners. Séan Kelly was the first English-speaking rider to win in 1984. Belgian Frank Vandenbroucke became the youngest winner in 1996, at the age of 21. Italian Vincenzo Nibali, on his way to cycling legend, took a surprise victory in 2006, at the age of 22. Australians Simon Gerrans and Matthew Goss won in 2009 and 2010 respectively, with Norway's Edvald Boasson Hagen soloing to victory in 2012 and Italy's Filippo Pozzato helping resurrect his career with a surprise win in 2013.

In 2014 the attackers managed to hold off the chasing peloton, with Frenchman Sylvain Chavanel winning the seven-man sprint. Alexander Kristoff was only two seconds behind, winning the sprint for eighth place. In 2015 it was Kristoff's turn for victory, leading out a bunch sprint of 69 riders.

Route
The race starts and finishes in the small village of Plouay, in the heartland of French cycling. The course consists of eight laps of a demanding  circuit and one  lap in the backdrop of Brittany. The circuit is known for its high rate of attrition, featuring climbs and technical descents.

The first climb is addressed almost immediately after the start as the race goes over the Côte du Lézot, a  climb with an average gradient of 6%. Next is a gentle  ascent up to the Chapelle Sainte-Anne des Bois, marking the halfway point of the circuit. After a flat section, the race addresses the Côte de Ty-Marrec, with a maximum gradient of 10%.

Sometimes a small group of riders manages to stay away, but often they are caught by the sprinters and their teams in sight of the finish line.

Winners

Multiple winners

Wins per country

Grand Prix de Plouay for Women Elite

Since 2002, a women's event, the GP de Plouay, is organized the day before the men's race and on the same circuit. The women's race features six 19 km laps, totalling 114 km, and is part of the UCI Women's Road World Cup. Italian Noemi Cantele, Holland's Marianne Vos and British pair Emma Pooley and Lizzie Deignan hold the record with two wins.

Trivia
 No rider has won the race more than two times so far.
 The GP Ouest-France is one of only a few international sporting events organized entirely by volunteers: 600-700 members of the Comité des Fêtes de Plouay manage the proceedings of the organization.
 Plouay has organized the 2000 Road World Championships, using the circuit of the GP Ouest-France. Latvian Romāns Vainšteins won the elite men's road race, beating Zbigniew Spruch and Óscar Freire in a bunch sprint. Belorussian Zinaida Stahurskaia won the women's road race in a solo victory.

References

External links
 
 

 
Cycle races in France
UCI World Tour races
Classic cycle races
Recurring sporting events established in 1931
1931 establishments in France
UCI ProTour races
Sport in Morbihan